Columnella is a genus of bryozoans belonging to the family Farciminariidae.

The genus has almost cosmopolitan distribution.

Species:

Columnella accincta 
Columnella bipectinata 
Columnella borealis 
Columnella brasiliensis 
Columnella carinata 
Columnella delicatissima 
Columnella gracilis 
Columnella graminea 
Columnella magna 
Columnella pacifica 
Columnella tecta 
Columnella vipera

References

Bryozoan genera